Agathidium cortezi is a species of round fungus beetles in the family Leiodidae. It is named after conquistador Hernan Cortez, conqueror of the Aztec empire and colonial administrator of New Spain.

References 

Beetles described in 2005
Leiodidae